The Piłka Nożna Magazine Plebiscite is an annual plebiscite organized by the magazine journalists of Piłka Nożna (literally "Foot Ball"), the Polish football magazine. Participants choose the best player, best newcomer, best team, best coach and best foreign player in Polish football.

In Poland, since 1973, the title of Polish Footballer of the Year has been given. Kazimierz Deyna, a midfielder for Legia Warsaw, was the first winner, and Mirosaw Bulzacki was named best newcomer. Zbigniew Boniek achieved this distinction in 1982, becoming the first Polish football player to play for a foreign club.

Before 1973, similar polls were conducted by Polish weekly newspaper Sport out of Katowice, but less frequently.

Categories and winners

See also
Polish Sports Personality of the Year

References

External links
 Player of the year » Poland at WorldFootball.net

Annual events in Poland
Poland
Football in Poland
Polish awards